Solok (means valley) is a city in West Sumatra, Indonesia. Its motto is Kota Beras, abbreviation from "Bersih, Elok, Rapi, Aman dan Sejahtera". It has an area of 57.64 km2 (0.14 percent of the area of West Sumatra) and a population of 73,438 people at the 2020 census. Solok topography varies between the plains and hilly with a height of 390 m above sea level. There are three tributaries that cross Solok, namely Batang Lembang, Batang Gawan, and Batang Air Binguang.

Judging from the type of soil, 21.37 percent of the land in Solok is rice field and the remaining 78.63 percent is used for other than rice field. While the travel time from Solok to Padang is 75 minutes, to the city of Padang Panjang for 60 minutes and to Sawahlunto for 40 minutes.

Administration
Solok city is divided into two administrative districts (kecamatan), listed below with their areas and populations at the 2010 census and the 2020 census:

The two districts comprise respectively the west and east parts of the city.

Climate
Solok has a tropical rainforest climate (Af) with heavy rainfall year-round.

References

External links
 Official website